In the peerages of the British Isles, most titles have traditionally been created for men and with remainder to male heirs. However, some titles are created with special remainders to allow women to inherit them. Some of the oldest English baronies were created by writ and pass to female heirs when a peer dies with daughters and no sons, while some titles are created with a man's family in mind, if he is without sons and unlikely to produce any. The following is a list of women who have inherited titles with the British peerages.

14th century

15th century

16th century

17th century

18th century

19th century

20th century

21st century

See also
 List of peerages created for women

References

Women

Peerages